Martin Lawrence Weitzman (April 1, 1942 – August 27, 2019) was an economist and a professor of economics at Harvard University. He was among the most influential economists in the world according to Research Papers in Economics (RePEc). His latest research was largely focused on environmental economics, specifically climate change and the economics of catastrophes.

Personal
A New York Times obituary details how Weitzman "was born Meyer Levinger on April 1, 1942, on the Lower East Side of Manhattan to Joseph and Helen (Tobias) Levenger. His mother died before he was 1; his father, after returning from military service in World War II, was apparently unable to care for the child, and he was placed in an orphanage. His adoptive parents, Samuel and Fannie (Katzelnick) Weitzman, who were elementary-school teachers, gave him the name Martin Lawrence Weitzman."

Weitzman received a B.A. in Mathematics and Physics from Swarthmore College in 1963. He went on to receive an M.S. in Statistics and Operations Research from Stanford University in 1964, and then attended Massachusetts Institute of Technology where he received a Ph.D. in Economics in 1967. Weitzman first joined the Yale University faculty, in 1967, moved to the Massachusetts Institute of Technology, before joining the economics department at Harvard University in 1989, where he taught until his death in 2019. In 2005 Weitzman was arrested on charges of stealing manure from a farm in Rockport MA.  The 98-year-old farmer accused Weitzman of multiple manure thefts from the farm. In return for dismissal of the charges Weitzman agreed to pay the farmer $600 and to make an additional $300 charitable donation in lieu of performing community service. Weitzman died by suicide on August 27, 2019 at the age of 77.

Research
Weitzman's research covered a wide range of topics including environmental and natural resource economics, green accounting, economics of biodiversity, economics of environmental regulation, economics of climate change, discounting, comparative economic systems, economics of profit sharing, economic planning, and microfoundations of macro theory.

Much of Weitzman's research was focused on climate change. Traditional cost-benefit analysis of climate change looks at the costs of reducing global warming (the cost of reducing greenhouse gas emissions) versus the benefits (potentially stopping or slowing climate change). However, in most analyses, the damages that would stem from dramatic climate change are not taken into consideration. Weitzman added dramatic climate change to the cost-benefit analysis to show that immediate measures must be taken in climate change regulation.

Weitzman's past research was focused on fixed versus profit sharing wages and their effect on unemployment. He proposed that, when firms use profit sharing wages, meaning employees receive higher wages when a company is doing well, firms have lower rates of unemployment and do better during recessions.

Weitzman is known for was his study of price versus quantity controls. Weitzman proposed that when faced with uncertainty the relative slopes of the marginal benefits versus the marginal costs must be examined in order to determine which type of control will be most effective. For example, in the case of pollution, the relative slopes of marginal costs and marginal damages must be examined (the marginal benefits are the avoidance of the marginal damages). His research showed that if the slope of marginal costs is steeper, price controls are more effective and if the relative slope of marginal damages is steeper, then quantity controls are more effective.

Weitzman also derived the Gittins index – a celebrated result in the applied probability literature – independently from (and in parallel to) John C. Gittins.

Teaching
Weitzman began his teaching career in 1967 as an assistant professor of economics at Yale University. Three years later Weitzman was promoted to associate professor, and he remained in this position until 1972 when he joined the faculty at the Massachusetts Institute of Technology as an associate professor. In 1974, Weitzman became a professor at MIT, where he taught until 1989. From 1986 to 1989, Weitzman was recognized as a Mitsui professor at MIT. In 1989, Weitzman became an Ernest E. Monrad Professor of Economics at Harvard University and has remained in this position for the last 18 years. He taught two graduate courses: Ec2680 Environmental and Natural Resource Economics and Ec2690, Environmental Economics and Policy Seminar.

Other positions
Weitzman served as a consultant to The World Bank, Stanford Research Institute, International Monetary Fund, Agency for International Development, Arthur D. Little Co., the Canadian Parliamentary Committee on Employment, Icelandic Committee on Natural Resources, and the National Academy Panel on Integrated Environmental and Economic Accounting.

He also served as associate editor of the following publications: Journal of Comparative Economics, Economics Letters, Journal of Japanese and International Economies, Journal of Environmental Economics and Management.

Recognition
 National Science Foundation Fellow, 1963–1965
 Woodrow Wilson Fellow, 1963–64
 Ford Foundation Dissertation Fellow, 1966
 Guggenheim Fellow, 1970–71
 Fellow of the Econometric Society, 1976–present
 Fellow of the American Academy of Arts and Sciences, 1986–present
 Association of Environmental and Resource Economists: Special Award for "Publication of Enduring Quality".
 Keynote speaker, 2002 World Congress of Environmental Economists
 Keynote speaker, 2006 World Congress of Animal Geneticists

Works

Books
Weitzman wrote three books: The Share Economy: Conquering Stagflation; Income, Wealth, and the Maximum Principle; and, most recently, Climate Shock, jointly with Gernot Wagner.  In The Share Economy: Conquering Stagflation, Weitzman proposed that a main cause of stagflation is paying workers a fixed wage, regardless of how the company is performing. He introduced an alternate labor payment system as a way of combating stagflation. Income, Wealth, and the Maximum Principle is a book geared to advanced economic students, particularly those who want to be able to formulate and solve complex allocation problems and who are interested in the relationship between income accounting and wealth or welfare. Climate Shock details how what we know about global warming is bad and what we don't know is potentially much worse.

Papers
Weitzman published over 90 papers, many of which appeared in economics journals. Several of his papers are listed below. His last paper was published in 2019.

 
 
 

Weitzman, M.L. (2018). "Potentially Large Equilibrium Climate Sensitivity Tail Uncertainty". Economics Letters. 168: 144-146.pii/S0165176518301733?via%3Dihub
Weitzman, M.L. (2019)."Prices Versus Quantities across Jurisdictions". Journal of the Association of Environmental and Resource Economists. 6 (5): 883-891. doi:10.1086/704493

References

External links

 Home page

1942 births
2019 deaths
Writers from Manhattan
Environmental economists
Climate economists
Energy economists
Swarthmore College alumni
Stanford University alumni
MIT School of Humanities, Arts, and Social Sciences alumni
Harvard University faculty
Fellows of the Econometric Society
20th-century American economists
Jewish American academics
21st-century American economists
People from the Lower East Side
21st-century American Jews